The men's 400 metre freestyle competition of the swimming events at the 2015 World Aquatics Championships was held on 2 August with the heats and the final.

Records
Prior to the competition, the existing world and championship records were as follows.

Results

Heats
The heats were held at 09:48.

Final

The final was held at 17:42.

References

Men's 400 metre freestyle